Gente bien (English: Well-to-do People) is a Mexican telenovela produced by Lucy Orozco for Televisa in 1997.

On Monday, April 28, 1997, Canal de las Estrellas started broadcasting Gente bien weekdays at 7:00pm, replacing Mi querida Isabel. The last episode was broadcast on Friday, August 15, 1997 with Amada enemiga replacing it the following day.

Patricia Manterola and Mario Cimarro starred as protagonists, while the leading actors César Évora and Julián Pastor starred as antagonists. The leading actresses María Rivas, Isela Vega, Helena Rojo and Ana Martín starred as stellar performances.

Cast 
Patricia Manterola as María Figueroa
Mario Cimarro as Gerardo Felipe
Helena Rojo as Rebecca Balmori de Dumas
César Évora as Jaime Dumas
Isela Vega as Mercedes Figueroa
Ana Martín as Alicia Dumas de Klein
María Rivas as Doña Sara Vda. de Dumas "Mamá Sara"
Julián Pastor as Dr. Adolfo Klein
Patricia Bernal as Angélica Medina
Daniel Gauvry as Rafael Lazcano
Alec Von Bargen as Mauricio Dumas
Ariadne Welter as Consuelo
Marta Aura as Márgara
Bárbara Eibenshutz as Liz Dumas
Jorge Capin as Wolf
Leif Janivitz as Benjamín Klein
Masha Kostiurina as Sabina Klein
Gabriela Murray as Yolanda
Felipe Nájera as Diego
Genoveva Pérez as Amaranta
Alicia del Lago as Conchita
Claudette Maillé as Ximena
Ariane Pellicer as Celia
Rubén Rojo Aura as Jaimito Dumas
Bruno Schwebel as Father Bernardo
Jorge Zárate as Esteban
José Luis Avendaño as Baltazar
Raquel Garza as Martita
Marcela Morett as Reina
Vicky Rodel as Vicky
Paloma Woolrich as Irma
Salma Hayek as Teresa
Rafael Mercadante
Héctor Sáez
Quintín Bulnes
Yaoli Bello
Ernesto Bog
Wenceslao Rangel
Polo Salazar
Eduardo Liñán
Ramón Abascal

References

External links

1997 telenovelas
Mexican telenovelas
1997 Mexican television series debuts
1997 Mexican television series endings
Spanish-language telenovelas
Television shows set in Mexico
Televisa telenovelas